Gunerius Pettersen may refer to:

 Gunerius Pettersen (1826–1892), Norwegian businessperson
 Gunerius Pettersen (1857–1940), Norwegian businessperson
 Gunerius Pettersen (1921) (1921–2012), Norwegian businessperson
 Gunerius Pettersen (company)

Pettersen, Gunerius